Dave Brown (born 4 December 1957) is a British political cartoonist for the Independent newspaper in London.

Brown began his career at The Sunday Times in 1989, working for other publications before joining The Independent in 1998.

Controversy 

Brown became well known for his cartoon of former Israeli Prime Minister Ariel Sharon as a "Monster eating Palestinian babies" in a paraphrase on Saturn Devouring One of his Children, a grotesque painting done by Francisco de Goya in 1819. For this cartoon, Brown won the 2003 Political Cartoon of the Year award, presented by the former cabinet minister Clare Short on 25 November 2003 at the headquarters of The Economist in London.

After it received numerous complaints, the Press Complaints Commission (PCC) decided that the cartoon did not breach its code.

See also
Media coverage of the Arab-Israeli conflict
Carlos Latuff

References

External links
Lambiek Comiclopedia biography.
"Saturn Devouring One of his Children" by Francisco de Goya
British Cartoon Archive, University of Kent, Canterbury, UK
The Independent daily cartoon

1957 births
British editorial cartoonists
Living people
Place of birth missing (living people)